HMCS Harry DeWolf (AOPV 430) is the lead ship of its class of offshore patrol vessels for the Royal Canadian Navy (RCN). The class was derived from the Arctic Offshore Patrol Ship project as part of the National Shipbuilding Procurement Strategy and is primarily designed for the patrol and support of Canada's Arctic regions. Named after Vice Admiral Harry DeWolf, a former head of the RCN, the vessel was ordered in 2011, laid down in 2016 and launched in 2018. The vessel completed contractors sea trials in July 2020, was delivered to the RCN on 31 July 2020 and began post-acceptance sea trials. Harry DeWolf was commissioned on 26 June 2021.

Design and description
The s are designed for use in the Arctic regions of Canada for patrol and support within Canada's exclusive economic zone. The ship has an enclosed foredeck that protects machinery and work spaces from Arctic climates. The vessel is powered by a diesel-electric system composed of four  MAN 6L32/44CR four-stroke medium-speed diesel generators and two electric propulsion motors rated at  driving two shafts. The ship is also equipped with a bow thruster to aid during manoeuvres and docking procedures without requiring tugboat assistance. Harry DeWolf is equipped with fin stabilizers to decrease roll in open water but can be retracted during icebreaking.

Harry DeWolf is able to deploy with multiple payloads, including shipping containers, underwater survey equipment or landing craft. Payload operations are aided by a  crane for loading and unloading. The ship is equipped with a vehicle bay which can hold pickup trucks, all-terrain vehicles and snowmobiles. The ship is armed with one BAE Mk 38  gun and two M2 Browning machine guns. The patrol ship has an onboard hangar and flight deck for helicopters up to the size of a Sikorsky CH-148 Cyclone. Harry DeWolf has a complement of 65 and accommodation for 85 or 87.

Construction

The order for the Arctic Offshore Patrol Ships was placed on 19 October 2011 with Irving Shipyards of Halifax, Nova Scotia, as part of the National Shipbuilding Procurement Strategy. The ship was to be constructed in 62 blocks, which would then be pieced together into three larger blocks. These three "mega blocks" would be fitted together to form the hull of the ship. On 18 September 2014, it was announced that the first ship of the class was to be named Harry DeWolf in honour of Rear Admiral Harry DeWolf, a decorated naval officer who served during World War II in European waters and as the Royal Canadian Navy Chief of the Naval Staff during the early Cold War. The ship was given the hull number AOPV 430. On 18 June 2015 it was reported that the construction of test modules for Harry DeWolf was underway. The first sections of keel were placed on 11 March 2016, but the official laying of the keel of Harry DeWolf was held on 9 June 2016, marking the first naval construction in Canada since 1998. On 8 December 2017, the three main sections of Harry DeWolf were fitted into place.

Harry DeWolf was launched on 15 September 2018. The vessel was loaded onto the semi-submersible barge Boa Barge 37 and taken out into Halifax Harbour. There, the barge was submerged and the ship floated free, to be towed back to the shipyard. The vessel was officially named at Halifax on 5 October 2018 by sponsor Sophie Grégoire Trudeau, the wife of Prime Minister Justin Trudeau. Harry DeWolf began builders sea trials on 22 November 2019. The ship was delivered to the Royal Canadian Navy on 31 July 2020 and began post-acceptance sea trials. The ship was commissioned on 26 June 2021.

Service history 

Harry DeWolf embarked on its inaugural deployment on 3 August 2021. It participated in Operation Nanook, Canada's annual sovereignty operation and manoeuvre warfare exercise conducted in the Arctic, alongside  and elements of the Canadian Coast Guard and the United States Coast Guard. The ship then proceeded through the Northwest Passage, and docked at CFB Esquimalt on 4 October 2021. Harry DeWolf left CFB Esquimalt on 22 October 2021, and sailed to the Caribbean Sea and Atlantic Ocean via the Panama Canal. During this second leg of its journey, it took part in Operation Caribbe — Canada's contribution to the US-led anti-drug smuggling effort Operation Martillo — and seized almost  of cocaine. Harry DeWolf returned to CFB Halifax on 16 December 2021, becoming the first Canadian naval vessel to circumnavigate North America since  made a similar voyage in 1954.

In August 2022, Harry DeWolf was among the Canadian warships that were to be deployed to the Arctic as part of the multinational military exercise Operation Nanook. However, after two of four generators on the ship ceased functioning, the ship's participation in the exercise was cancelled due to a need to return to Halifax for repairs. The ship is not expected to return to service until April 2023.

References

Harry DeWolf-class offshore patrol vessels
2018 ships
Ships built in Nova Scotia